In human anatomy, the median cubital vein (or median basilic vein) is a superficial vein of the arm. It lies in the cubital fossa superficial to the bicipital aponeurosis. It connects the cephalic vein and the basilic vein. It becomes prominent when pressure is applied. It is routinely used for venipuncture (taking blood) and as a site for an intravenous cannula. This is due to its particularly wide lumen, and its tendency to remain stationary upon needle insertion.

Structure 
The median cubital vein is a superficial vein of the arm. It lies in the cubital fossa superficial to the bicipital aponeurosis. It connects the cephalic vein and the basilic vein. It becomes prominent when pressure is applied to upstream veins, as venous blood builds up.

Variations 
The median cubital vein shows a wide range of variations. More commonly, the vein forms an H-pattern with the cephalic and basilic veins making up the sides. Other forms include an M-pattern, where the vein branches to the cephalic and basilic veins.

Clinical significance 
The median cubital vein is routinely used for venipuncture (taking blood) and as a site for an intravenous cannula. This is due to its particularly wide lumen, and its tendency to remain stationary upon needle insertion. It becomes prominent when pressure is applied upstream, which makes needle insertion easier. Such pressure is created using a tourniquet.

Additional images

See also 
 Basilic vein
 Cephalic vein

References

External links 
 
 

Veins of the upper limb